Bitoma crenata is a species of cylindrical bark beetle in the family Zopheridae. It is found in North America and Europe.

References

Further reading

External links

 

Zopheridae
Articles created by Qbugbot
Beetles described in 1775
Taxa named by Johan Christian Fabricius